Dr Ranjit Kumar Panja was an Indian politician. He was elected to the Lok Sabha, the lower house of the Parliament of India from the Barasat constituency of West Bengal in 1998 and 1999 as a member of the Trinamool Congress.

References

External links
 Official biographical sketch in Parliament of India website

1932 births
2006 deaths
Trinamool Congress politicians from West Bengal
Lok Sabha members from West Bengal
India MPs 1998–1999
India MPs 1999–2004
People from North 24 Parganas district